American Museum may refer to:

American Museum of Radio and Electricity, now the SPARK Museum of Electrical Invention, Bellingham, Washington
American Museum of Natural History, Central Park West at 79th Street, New York City, established 1869
American Museum of the Moving Image, Astoria, Queens, New York City, opened 1988
American Museum of Magic, Marshall, Michigan (collection of Harry Blackstone, Sr.), opened 1978
American Museum of Science and Energy (previously American Museum of Atomic Energy, renamed 1978), Oak Ridge, Tennessee, founded 1949
American Museum and Gardens, Claverton Manor, near Bath, Somerset, England, founded 1961
Barnum's American Museum (formerly Scudder's American Museum), Broadway and Ann Street, New York City, 1841–1865
Musée américain, a pre-Columbian art section of the Louvre, Paris, 1851-1887
The American Museum (magazine), an 18th-century American magazine, published by Matthew Carey, in Philadelphia, Pennsylvania, January 1787 to December 1792
The American Museum, a 19th-century American magazine published by Nathan C. Brooks of Baltimore

See also
Japanese American National Museum
American Museum Novitates
California African American Museum
Chinese American Museum